Badalpur is the name of several towns and villages in India. It may refer to:

 Badalpur, Gautam Buddh Nagar, Uttar Pradesh, India
 Badalpur, Patna, a town in Patna district, Bihar
 Badalpur, Jaunpur district, a village in Uttar Pradesh
 Badalpur, a village in Nalanda district, Bihar